Cliff May (1903–1989) was an architect practicing in California best known and remembered for developing the suburban Post-war "dream home" (California Ranch House), and the Mid-century Modern.

The Ranch-style house

May built Monterey-style furniture as a young man. As a residential/building designer, May designed projects throughout Southern California, including the regions around San Diego, Los Angeles, and Santa Barbara, California. He is credited with creating the pitched-roof, low-slung California Ranch-style house in 1932. He had very little training as an architect, and never had the need to formally register as a licensed architect.

During his career, May designed numerous commercial buildings, over a thousand custom residences, and from model house prototypes more than eighteen thousand tract houses had his imprint. May synthesized Spanish Colonial Revival architecture with abstracted California adobe ranchos and Modern architecture.  Robert Mondavi chose May to design his winery in which he incorporated features found in construction of California Missions.

In 1932 May's first house sold for $9,500. His work drew attention and the second home he built was featured in Architectural Digest in 1934. He continued to build 50 additional houses in San Diego before moving to Los Angeles in 1935. Many of his 1,000+ houses were built in Southern California, however some were built as far away as Switzerland, Australia and Ireland. During the 1940s and 50s, his work was featured in many publications including Architectural Forum, American Home, California arts and Architecture, Architectural Digest, House Beautiful, Sunset Magazine, Modernism Magazine, Southern California Quarterly, among others.

During the 1950s May, along with colleague Chris Choate designed prefabricated tract ranch homes which they sold to builders across the US. Many of these prefab tracts like Rancho Estates in Long Beach were popular and resulted in many homes in the tracts being built and sold. Some, particularity those outside of California, were unprofitable and only resulted in the model homes being built. The partnership between May and Choate ended in 1956 with May's departure.

May said of his architecture, "The ranch house was everything a California house should be -it had cross-ventilation, the floor was level with the ground, and with its courtyard and the exterior corridor, it was about sunshine and informal outdoor living."

The HGTV television show Flip or Flop featured remodels of two Cliff May homes.

Projects 
Selected works include:

 O'Leary House (1932), San Diego, California
 Lindstrom House (1933), San Diego, California, (National Register of Historic Places)
 Sheldon Hodge House (1933), San Diego, California, destroyed by gas explosion in the 1970s
 Porterfield Beardsley House (1933), San Diego, California, (May's first commissioned house)
 Highland House (1934), San Diego, California, (listed on the City of San Diego's Historic Register)
 Whalen House (1935), in Bonita, California
 Tucker House (1936), in San Diego, California
 Hacienda Ranch House (1936), in San Diego, California 
 Smith House (1936), in La Habra Heights, California
 Oakmont House (1939), in Brentwood Park, Los Angeles, California
 House Beautiful's Pacesetter House (1947), in Los Angeles, California
 Sullivan Canyon Ranches (c.1948), in Los Angeles, California
 Prefab House (1951), in Phoenix, Arizona
 Cliff May Experimental House (1952), in Los Angeles, California
 Tanglewood House (1952), in Lubbock, Texas
 Rancho Rinconada (April 1953) present eastern Cupertino, California - Cliff May pre-fab subdivision of "around 900 homes (per May) (built with Stern & Price) 
 Lakewood Rancho Prefab Homes (700+ homes) (1953-1954), in Long Beach, California
 Prefab Homes (1954), in Tucson, Arizona
 Lakewood Prefab Homes (1954), in Lakewood, Washington
 Casa View Oaks Prefab Homes (1954-1955), in Dallas, Texas
 Charleston Heights Prefab Homes (1954-1955), in Las Vegas, Nevada 
 Harvey Park Prefab Homes (1955), in Denver, Colorado
 2 Prefab Homes (1955), in Odessa, Texas
 Cherokee Village Prefab Houses (1955), in Cherokee Village, Arkansas
 Castle Hills Prefab Homes (1955), in San Antonio, Texas
 Maywood Hills Prefab Homes (1955), in Salt Lake City, Utah
Fish-Baughman House (1955), in Millcreek, Utah, listed on the National Register of Historic Places in 2016
Cliff May House "Mandalay" (1955), in Brentwood, Los Angeles, California
 Cliff May pre-fab homes (9) in Medford, Oregon.  (with J.T. Hight builders)
 Cliff May prefab homes - (1956) Santa Maria, California (with builder George Pabst)
Overdale House (1956), in Columbus, Ohio
Vientos House (1963), in Camarillo, California
Ocotillo House (1963), in Tucson, Arizona
Oxblow House (1968), in Solvang, California
Private Residence (1969), in Phoenix, Arizona
Charles House (1973), in Fresno, California 
El Vuelo House (1973), in Rancho Santa Fe, California
Gerald Katell House (1978), in Rolling Hills, California
 Cliff May tract-housing (79 units, 1956), Westridge Manor, Bishop, California  (with Marburt Homes, Inc.)

Personal life
May grew up in San Diego, California. On his mother's side he is related to Jose Antonio Estudillo, one of the founders of San Diego. His father's side of the family held a lifetime lease on the old Los Flores Rancho in San Diego County. May lived in his 10,000 square foot "ultimate ranch house" located on a 15-acre site in one of the canyons in the Santa Monica Mountains near Brentwood. May was a record collector and amateur saxophone player and piano player; his home had a sound system that piped-in music to every indoor and outdoor space.

May was also a pilot; he made many trips in his plane to Mexico during his lifetime.

Death
May died in 1989 at the age of 83, at his estate "Mandalay" in Sullivan Canyon in the Brentwood neighborhood of Los Angeles, California.

Legacy
In 2012, the UC Santa Barbara Art, Design & Architecture Museum and the organization Pacific Standard Time mounted a retrospective exhibition, Carefree California: Cliff May and the Romance of the Ranch, 1920-1960. Several books have been published about his work, including the 2008 Rizzoli publication, Cliff May and the Modern Ranch House.

An archive of Cliff May's papers, c. 1931–1989, consisting of 350 linear feet of papers, correspondence, clippings, photographs and ephermera is held in the Architecture and Design Collection of the Art, Design & Architecture Museum at the University Santa Barbara.

See also
 Cliff May Experimental House

References

Further reading
 Cliff May and the California Ranch House, Laura Gallegos, California State University, Sacramento. (PDF)
 Cliff May Architecture
 “Designer of the Dream” by Mary A. van Balgooy published in the Southern California Quarterly 86, No. 2 (2004).
 "Before LA: Cliff May's Beginnings in San Diego" by Mary A. van Balgooy published in The Journal of San Diego History 57, No. 4 (2011).
Editorial staff of Sunset Magazine and Books.  Western Ranch Houses by Cliff May.  Menlo Park, CA:  Lane Publishing Company, 1954.  Pages 126–131.

External links
Interview of Cliff May, Center for Oral History Research, UCLA Library Special Collections, University of California, Los Angeles.
 Cliff May and the Modern Ranch House, Rizzoli, 2008.
 Cliff May Home Registry

Architects from California
1903 births
1989 deaths
20th-century American architects